Røros Chapel is a chapel in Røros municipality in Trøndelag county, Norway. It is located in the town of Røros at the north end of the Røros churchyard (and the large Røros Church sits at the south end). It is a chapel in the Røros parish which is part of the Gauldal prosti (deanery) in the Diocese of Nidaros. The stone chapel was built in a circular style inspired by the Goahti of the Sami people in 1962 using plans drawn up by the architect Erik Guldahl. The church seats about 220 people.

Media gallery

See also
List of churches in Nidaros

References

Røros
Churches in Trøndelag
Fan-shaped churches in Norway
Stone churches in Norway
20th-century Church of Norway church buildings
Churches completed in 1962
1962 establishments in Norway